Lutgardis of Aywières (1182 – 16 June 1246; also spelled Lutgarde) is a saint from the medieval Low Countries. She was born in Tongeren, known as Tongres in French (which is why she is also called Lutgardis of Tongres or Luitgard of Tonger(e)n), and entered monastic life at the age of twelve. During her life various miracles were attributed to her, and she is known to have experienced religious ecstasy. Her feast day is June 16.

Life

Lutgardis was born at Tongeren in 1182.  She was admitted into the Benedictine monastery of St. Catherine near Sint-Truiden at the age of twelve, not because of a vocation but because her dowry had been lost in a failed business venture. She was attractive, fond of nice clothes and liked to enjoy herself. For Lutgarde the cloister represented a socially acceptable alternative to the disgrace of unmarried life in the world. She lived in the convent for several years without having much interest in religious life. She could come and go and receive visitors as she pleased.

According to her Vita, it was in the parlour, a welcome break in the monotony of monastic observance, that she was visited with a vision of Jesus Christ showing her his wounds, and at age twenty she made her solemn vows as a Benedictine. Some of the sisters predicted that her change in behavior would not last. Instead, she became even more devout. Over the next dozen years, she had many visions of Christ, Mary and St. John the Evangelist. Robert Bellarmine relates a story that Pope Innocent III, when recently deceased, appeared to Lutgardis in her monastery to thank her for the prayers and sacrifices she had offered for him during his reign as Roman Pontiff.

Accounts of her life state that she experienced ecstasies, levitated, and dripped blood from her forehead and hair when entranced. She refused the honor of serving as abbess.  However, in 1205, she was chosen to be prioress of her community.

In 1208, at Aywières (Awirs), near Liège, she joined the Cistercians, a stricter order, on the advice of her friend Christina. The nuns of Aywières spoke French, not Lutgarde's native Flemish. Lutgard deliberately didn't learn French in order to live in greater silence. Living, working, and praying in the midst of her sisters she experienced a loneliness and solitude that she had never known before. Nonetheless, she contributed powerful images to the developing Christocentric mysticism.

The prolific multiplication of Cistercian monasteries of women in the Low Countries obliged the White Nuns to turn to the newly founded friars, disciples of Francis and Dominic, rather than to their brother monks, for spiritual and sacramental assistance. Lutgarde was a friend and mother to the early Dominicans and Franciscans, supporting their preaching by her prayer and fasting, offering them hospitality, ever eager for news of their missions and spiritual conquests. Her first biographer relates that the friars named her mater praedicatorum, the mother of preachers.

Lutgardis was one of the great precursors of the devotion to the Sacred Heart of Jesus. The first recorded mystic revelation of Christ's heart is that of Lutgardis. According to Thomas Merton, Lutgardis "…entered upon the mystical life with a vision of the pierced Heart of the Saviour, and had concluded her mystical espousals with the Incarnate Word by an exchange of hearts with Him." When, in a visitation, Christ came to Lutgarde, offering her whatever gift of grace she should desire, she asked for a better grasp of Latin, that she might better understand the Word of God and lift her voice in choral praise. Christ granted her request and, after a few days, Lutgarde's mind was flooded with the riches of psalms, antiphons, readings and responsories. However, a painful emptiness persisted. With disarming candour she returned to Christ, asking to return his gift, and wondering if she might, just possibly, exchange it for another. “And for what would you exchange it?” Christ asked. “Lord, said Lutgarde, I would exchange it for your Heart.” Christ then reached into Lutgarde and, removing her heart, replaced it with his own, at the same time hiding her heart within his breast.

During this time she is known to have shown gifts of healing and prophecy, and was an adept at teaching the Gospels.  She was blind for the last eleven years of her life, and died of natural causes at Aywières.  According to tradition, she experienced a vision in which Christ informed her of her forthcoming death. She died on June 16, 1246, the day after the Feast of the Holy Trinity, at the age of 64.

Veneration

Lutgardis is considered one of the leading mystics of the 13th century. A life of Lutgardis, Vita Lutgardis, was composed less than two years after her death by Thomas of Cantimpre, a Dominican friar and a theologian of some ability. A Middle Dutch verse translation of this, the Leven van Lutgart, was produced in the second half of the 13th century and is now regarded as one of the canonical works of Dutch literature. Lutgardis was venerated at Aywières for centuries, and her relics were exhumed in the 16th century.  On December 4, 1796, as a result of the French Revolution, her relics were sheltered at Ittre, where they remain. Works of art depicting the saint include a baroque statue of Lutgardis by Matthias Braun on Charles Bridge in Prague and a painting by Goya. The statue on Charles Bridge (socha sv. Luitgardy) was sculpted by Braun in 1710 as a commission from Evžen Tyttl, the abbot of the Cistercian monastery in Plasy.

Lutgardis is the patron saint of the blind and physically disabled. In the 19th century, she was also taken as a patron of the Flemish movement because of her inability to speak Walloon.

References

Further reading
Thomas Merton, The Life of a Cistercian Mystic: Saint Lutgarde of Aywières (Milwaukee: Bruce Publishing Company, 1950)

External links
Lutgardis of Aywières
Saint Lutgardis on BALaT – Belgian Art Links and Tools (KIK-IRPA, Brussels)
Lutgard
 Archives of Parish church Sint-Lutgardis, Tongeren in ODIS - Online Database for Intermediary Structures 

13th-century Christian saints
1182 births
1246 deaths
Women of medieval Belgium
Belgian Roman Catholic saints
Cistercian nuns
Belgian blind people
13th-century Christian mystics
Roman Catholic mystics
Christian female saints of the Middle Ages
People from Tongeren